Theatre-fiction refers to novels and short-stories that focus on theatre. Characters often include actors, playwrights, directors, prompters, understudies, set designers, critics, or casting agents. Common settings may include theatre auditoriums, dressing rooms, rehearsal spaces, or other places in which theatre is created and performed. Theatre-fiction may engage with and represent many different varieties of theatre, from performances of Shakespearean tragedy to Kabuki theatre to pantomime or marionette shows.

Further reading
 Ackerman, Alan. The Portable Theatre: American Literature and the Nineteenth-Century Stage. Baltimore, MA: Johns Hopkins UP, 1999.
 Allen, Emily. Theater Figures: The Production of the Nineteenth-Century British Novel. Columbus: Ohio State UP, 2003.
 Barish, Jonas. The Anti-theatrical Prejudice. Berkeley: U of California P, 1981.
 Brooks, Peter. The Melodramatic Imagination: Balzac, Henry James, Melodrama, and the Mode of Excess. New Haven: Yale UP, 1976.
 Brooks, Peter. Realist Vision. New Haven: Yale UP, 2008.
 Buckler, Julie. The Literary Lorgnette: Attending Opera in Imperial Russia. Stanford: Stanford UP, 2000.
 Dickinson, Linzy Erika. Theatre in Balzac’s La Comédie Humaine. Amsterdam: Brill, 2000.
 Franklin, Jeffrey. Serious Play: The Cultural Form of the Nineteenth-Century Realist Novel. U of Pennsylvania P, 1999.
 Jouanny, Sylvie. L'actrice et ses doubles: figures et représentations de la femme de spectacle à la fin de XIXe siècle. Genève: Droz, 2002.
 Kurnick, David. Empty Houses: Theatrical Failure and the Novel. Princeton: Princeton UP, 2012.
 Litvak, Joseph. Caught in the Act: Theatricality in the Nineteenth-century English Novel. Berkeley: U of California P, 1992. 
 Marshall, Gail. Actresses on the Victorian Stage: Feminine Performance and the Galatea Myth. Cambridge: Cambridge UP, 1998.
 Miller, Renata Kobetts. The Victorian Actress in the Novel and on the Stage. Edinburgh: Edinburgh UP, 2020.
 Newark, Cormac. Opera in the Novel From Balzac to Proust. Cambridge: Cambridge UP, 2011.
 Newey, Katherine. Women’s Theatre Writing in Victorian Britain. New York: Palgrave Macmillan, 2005.
 Putzel, Steven D. Virginia Woolf and the Theatre. Madison, New Jersey: Fairleigh Dickinson UP, 2012.
 Russell, Gillian. “The Novel and the Stage.” Oxford History of the Novel in English, vol. 2, English and British Fiction 1750-1820, edited by Peter Garside and Karen O’Brien, Oxford UP, 2015, pp. 513–529.
 Saggini, Francesca. Backstage in the Novel: Frances Burney and the Theater Arts. Trans. Laura Kopp. Charlottesville: U of Virginia P, 2012.
 Wolfe, Graham. "Eleanor Catton’s The Rehearsal: Theatrical Fantasy and the Gaze." Mosaic: A Journal for the Interdisciplinary Study of Literature 49.3 (2016): 91–108.
 Wolfe, Graham. "Theatrical Extraneity: John Irving’s A Prayer for Owen Meany and Dickensian Theatre-Fiction." Dickens Quarterly 35.4 (2018): 350–372.
 Wolfe, Graham. Theatre-Fiction in Britain from Henry James to Doris Lessing: Writing in the Wings. New York: Routledge, 2019.

References

Literary genres
Fiction